Abdul Muyeed Chowdhury is a retired Bangladeshi career bureaucrat and former adviser, with the rank of minister, of Latifur Rahman caretaker government.

Early life
Chowdhury completed his bachelor's degree and Masters in History from Dhaka University in 1964 and 1965 respectively. He went to University of Tennessee on a Fulbright Program scholarship.

Career
Chowdhury joined the Civil Service of Pakistan in 1967. From 1975 to 1978, he was the Deputy Commissioner of Faridpur District. From 1994 to 2000, he served as Secretary in a number of ministries. He was the head of the Internal Resources Division and later the National Board of Revenue. In 2000, he served as an adviser to Latifur Rahman Cabinet with the rank of a minister. He worked as the executive director of BRAC from 2000 to 2006. He served as the Vice President of Bangladesh Olympic Association. He is the founder and CEO of Tiger Tours Limited. He is an independent director of ACI Limited, Pioneer Insurance Company Ltd, and Summit Alliance Port Limited. He is the director of MJLBL.

References

Living people
Advisors of Caretaker Government of Bangladesh
University of Dhaka alumni
Year of birth missing (living people)